The Medal for Participation in Operation Storm is a medal awarded by the Republic of Croatia for participation in Operation Storm. The medal was founded on April 1, 1995.

References 

Orders, decorations, and medals of Croatia